This is a list of some entertainment events that were held at the Qudos Bank Arena, previously known as the Sydney Super Dome. The largest indoor arena in Australia has since attracted many local and international artists to stage their performances at the venue. All events are arranged in chronological order.

1999–2010

2011–2020

2021–present

Gallery

References

External links 

Australian entertainment-related lists
Entertainment events in Australia
Events in Sydney
Lists of events by venue
Lists of events in Australia
Entertainment events at Sydney Super Dome